The Amazing Race Australia 3 is the third season of the Australian reality television game show The Amazing Race Australia, the Australian version of The Amazing Race. Officially titled The Amazing Race Australia v New Zealand, the season featured ten teams of two in a pre-existing relationship (five from Australia and five from New Zealand) in a race around the world to win the grand prize of A$250,000.

The show premiered on Australia's Seven Network on 4 August 2014 after The X-Factor, and on New Zealand's TV2 on 5 August 2014 after My Kitchen Rules 5.

Australian intensive care nurses Daniel Little and Ryan Thomas were the winners of this season.

Production

Development and Filming

On 14 August 2012, Seven Network announced it was looking for contestants for a third series of The Amazing Race Australia. Despite calling for contestant applications, the show was absent in the Seven Network's 2013 upfronts and was replaced by an unsuccessful revival of the Australian version of The Mole.

The series was renewed again on 22 October 2013. It was also announced that Seven's in-house production company, Seven Productions, would produce the series. ActiveTV, the production company involved in the show's first two series, would no longer be involved.

Filming began in March 2014 at Uluru in Uluṟu-Kata Tjuṯa National Park. This racecourse was the longest among the non-American versions and third longest overall behind the courses from The Amazing Race US 5 and The Amazing Race US 9.

Replacing marked for elimination, the Speed Bump was introduced during this third series. It required the team that finished last in a non-elimination leg to perform an additional task at some point during the next leg. The Salvage Pass returned; however, it was awarded to the team that arrived first in the sixth leg rather than the first.

Casting
Applications for the third edition originally opened during the second season, despite the show not being officially renewed by Seven Network. When the show was officially renewed for 2014, applications opened again, including to citizens of New Zealand. Applicants who applied previously were given a chance to update their application. This second round of applications ended on 22 December 2013.

Marketing
Kathmandu, John West Tuna and Virgin Australia were the sponsors for this series.

Cast
The cast includes Jesse O'Brien, who was previously a contestant on the first season of New Zealand Idol. He withdrew from the season to attend to the birth of his daughter. He then returned for the second season, where he placed fourth. He participated alongside his wife Cat. Well-known Australian anthropologist Elizabeth Grant participated alongside her son, Todd.

During Leg 6, Tyson Smith proposed to Sally Yamamoto on their fourth anniversary, and she accepted.

Future appearances
In 2019, Jonathan "Jono" Trenberth appeared on the third season of Married at First Sight NZ.

Results
The following teams participated in this season, with their relationships at the time of filming. Note that this table is not necessarily reflective of all content broadcast on television due to inclusion or exclusion of some data.  Placements are listed in finishing order.

A  placement with a dagger indicates that the team was eliminated.
An  placement with a double-dagger indicates that the team was the last to arrive at a pit stop in a non-elimination leg, and had to perform a Speed Bump task in the following leg.
 An italicized and underlined placement indicates that the team was the last to arrive at a pit stop, but there was no rest period at the pit stop and all teams were instructed to continue racing. There was no required Speed Bump task in the next leg.
A  indicates that the team won the Fast Forward. 
A  indicates that the team used an Express Pass on that leg to bypass one of their tasks.
A  indicates the leg has the Nation vs. Nation task, while a  indicates the team that lost the Nation vs. Nation.
 A  indicates that the team used a U-Turn and a  indicates the team on the receiving end of a U-Turn. 
A  indicates that the teams encountered an Intersection.
A  indicates the team used the Salvage Pass.

Notes

Prizes
Prizes were awarded throughout the season, generally to the team placing first in each leg but also for special tasks that took place throughout the season. Most prizes were sponsored by Virgin Australia and their affiliated products.
Leg 1 – Two Express Passes and two Business Class airline tickets to Los Angeles
Leg 2 – 10,000 voucher and two frequent flyer cards
Step Counter Task – A 30-minute time-credit for Leg 3, awarded to Daniel & Ryan
Leg 3 – Two tickets with Virgin and codeshare partners Etihad Airways to one of their European destinations and 5,000 spending money
Leg 4 – 500,000 Velocity Frequent Flyer Points which can be used for any Velocity reward of their choosing
Leg 5 – First class train tickets to their next destination for themselves and a team of their choice
Leg 6 – A five star, seven-night holiday for two to Phuket, Thailand from Virgin Holidays and the Salvage Pass
Leg 7 – Two Business Class airline tickets to Abu Dhabi, United Arab Emirates
Leg 8 – 10,000 voucher and a Platinum Velocity Frequent Flyer Card
Leg 9 –  A five star, seven-night holiday for two to Bali, Indonesia from Virgin Holidays
Leg 10 – 250,000
2nd & 3rd Place – 1,000,000 Velocity Frequent Flyer Points
Location Matching Task – Two Business Class tickets to Los Angeles, awarded to Daniel & Ryan
Notes

 The Express Pass could be used to skip any one task of the team's choosing until the fifth leg. The winning team kept one for themselves but had to relinquish the second to another team before the end of the third leg.
 The Salvage Pass has the power to give the holder an hour time-credit or to save the last placing team from elimination.

Race summary

Leg 1 (Australia → New Zealand)

Airdate: 4 August 2014 (AU); 5 August 2014 (NZ)
Uluṟu-Kata Tjuṯa National Park, Northern Territory, Australia (Uluru) (Starting Line)  
 Yulara (Ayers Rock Airport) to Christchurch, New Zealand (Christchurch Airport)
Christchurch (Cardboard Cathedral) (Overnight Rest)
Peel Forest (Rangitata River – Rangitata Rafts)
Mesopotamia (Rata Peak Station) 
Mesopotamia (Southern Alps) 

In this series' first Nation vs. Nation task, the ten teams were divided into two groups of five teams based on their nationality to compete in a "Trans-Tasman tug of war". The first nation to pull their opponents' flag past a marker would be given a 10-minute head start to the airport.

In this season's first Roadblock, one team member had to drive a tractor through a slalom course and move four hay bales into a marked area. Then, they had to go to a sheep paddock and find the sheep with the other half of their ring from the rafting challenge.

Additional tasks
At Ayers Rock Airport, teams had to book one of two Virgin Australia flights to Christchurch, the first of which carried four teams and arrived an hour before the second.
At Cardboard Cathedral, a church built after the 2011 Christchurch earthquake, teams had to take one of three departure times for the following morning: 8:00 a.m., 8:15 a.m., or 8:30 a.m. The next morning, teams would be given their next clue and had to find a marked Toyota RAV4.
At Rangitata Rafts on the Rangitata River, teams had to raft down grade five rapids and find one half of a ring from The Lord of the Rings to receive their next clue.
The two ring halves from the rafting task and the Roadblock told teams to "Continue west to the Pit Stop" towards the Southern Alps to find the Pit Stop.

Leg 2 (New Zealand → Cambodia)

Airdate: 11 August 2014 (AU); 12 August 2014 (NZ)
Christchurch (Cathedral Junction) (Pit Start)
 Christchurch (Christchurch Airport) to Siem Reap, Cambodia (Siem Reap International Airport)
Siem Reap (Penny Lane – Old Market)
Siem Reap (Tourist Information Center)
Siem Reap (Angkor Wat) 
Siem Reap (Tjoup Snae Restaurant)
  Tonlé Sap (Fishing Port or Chong Khneas)
Siem Reap (Baphuon) 

In this leg's Roadblock, one team member had to count the monks wearing red and yellow prayer beads. Once all monks were counted, team members had to collect an offering and find two other monks inside the temple. The racer had to pick one of the two monks to give their answer and the offering, but one of the monks would lie even if the racer had the right answer. Once the truth-telling monk was given the correct answer (26), he would give them their next clue. John & Murray used their Express Pass to bypass the Roadblock, but neither team member participated.

This season's first Detour was a choice between Shrimp or Shoot. In Shrimp, teams had to collect  of shrimp from fish traps in Tonlé Sap to receive their next clue from a fisherman. In Shoot, teams had to travel to the floating village of Chong Khneas and find the local pool hall, where they had to level out a pool table and then sink five balls, while competing against a local player, to receive their next clue.

Additional tasks
At Old Market, teams had to eat seven fried tarantulas with each individual team member having to eat at least three to receive their next clue from the vendor.
At the Tourist Information Center, teams had to buy entry tickets to Angkor Wat and would also be provided with step counters that they had to wear for the duration of the leg. The team with the closest number of steps between team members would receive a special prize at the end of the leg.
At Tjoup Snae Restaurant, teams had to write down the readings on their step counters before retrieving their next clue.

Leg 3 (Cambodia → Thailand)

Airdate: 18 August 2014 (AU); 19 August 2014 (NZ)
Siem Reap (Cambodian–Vietnamese War Memorial) (Pit Start)
 Poipet (Cambodia–Thailand Border Crossing) to Bangkok, Thailand (Mo Chit Bus Terminal)
Bangkok (Now Travel)
 Bangkok (Don Mueang International Airport) to Krabi (Krabi Airport)
Ao Nang (Thai Thai Massage)
  Ao Phang Nga National Park (Phra Nang Beach)
Ao Phang Nga National Park (East Railay Beach) 
  Ao Phang Nga National Park (Chicken Island)
 Hat Noppharat Thara–Mu Ko Phi Phi National Park (Koh Poda) 

This leg's Detour was a choice between Climb Up or Drill Down. For both Detour options, teams had to travel by long-tail boat to Phra Nang Beach. In Climb Up, both team members had to scale a sheer rock face to retrieve an Amazing Race flag, which they could exchange with a climbing guide for their next clue. In Drill Down, teams had to first build a hand drill and then use it to extract enough coconut juice from a pile of coconuts to fill a container to a marked line to receive their next clue from a barmaid.

In this leg's Roadblock, teams had to travel to a marked area of the sea, where one team member had dive down to the seafloor to retrieve a golden clam with a pearl that contained their next clue.

Additional tasks
At the start of the leg, teams had to travel by taxi to the border crossing in Poipet, cross it on foot, and then take a bus to reach Bangkok. After arriving in Bangkok, teams had to find Now Travel to retrieve their next clue.
At Thai Thai Massage, teams had to choose one of eight spa treatments, written in Thai and without knowing how long the treatment would take. Once the treatment was complete, teams would receive their next clue from the massage therapist.

Leg 4 (Thailand → Namibia)

Airdate: 25 August 2014 (AU); 26 August 2014 (NZ)
Ao Nang (Ao Nang Beach) (Pit Start)
 Krabi (Krabi Airport) to Windhoek, Namibia (Hosea Kutako International Airport)
Khomas Region (Na'an Kuse Wildlife Sanctuary – Baboon Walk) 
 Khomas Region (Na'an Kuse Wildlife Sanctuary – Lion Enclosure)
Khomas Region (Na'an Kuse Wildlife Sanctuary – Clever Cubs School)
 Khomas Region (Na'an Kuse Wildlife Sanctuary – Bushmen Village)
Khomas Region (Na'an Kuse Wildlife Sanctuary – Watering Hole) 

In this leg's Roadblock, one team member had to cut up a pile of offal and, following an example, prepare the correct quantity to feed to a pride of lions and receive their next clue. Carla & Hereni used their Express Pass given by John & Murray to bypass the Roadblock.

This leg's Detour was a choice between Pipe or Poo. For both Detour options, teams had to travel to a Bushmen village by donkey cart. In Pipe, teams had to use a traditional bush method to make a fire. Once the village chief was able to light his pipe, teams would receive their next clue.

Additional tasks
After arriving in Windhoek, teams had to search the airport car park for a vehicle with their next clue.
At Na'an Kuse Wildlife Sanctuary, teams had to lead two baboons along a marked path to receive their next clue.
At Clever Cubs School, teams had to learn a song in the local San language and perform it with the San school children to receive their next clue.

Leg 5 (Namibia → Russia)

Airdate: 25 August 2014 (AU); 2 September 2014 (NZ)
Khomas Region (Na'an Kuse Wildlife Sanctuary – Lodge) (Pit Start)
 Windhoek (Hosea Kutako International Airport) to Saint Petersburg, Russia (Pulkovo Airport)
Saint Petersburg (Battleship Aurora) 
Saint Petersburg (Nevsky Prospekt – Kazan Cathedral)
 Saint Petersburg (Beloselsky-Belozersky Palace)
Saint Petersburg (Taleon Imperial Hotel – Imperial Ballroom) 
Saint Petersburg (Church of the Saviour on Spilled Blood) 

In this leg's Roadblock, one team member had to decipher a message communicated by the ship commander from the top of the battleship in flag semaphore and written in the Russian Cyrillic alphabet ( ) to receive their next clue.

This leg's Detour was a choice between Cossack or Coat Rack. In Cossack, teams had to learn and perform a traditional Cossack dance to the satisfaction of the instructor receive their next clue. In Coat Rack, teams had to search through a pile of over three hundred tags to find the one that was missing. They had to then search the coats in the coat room for the missing tag, which they could exchange with the attendant for their next clue.

Additional tasks
After the Roadblock, teams were given a photograph of Kazan Cathedral as their only hint of the location of their next clue.
At the Taleon Imperial Hotel, teams encountered an Intersection. After pairing up, one team member from each of the two teams had to enter a vault full of highly sensitive lasers to retrieve a jeweled egg, which contained a small figurine of Church of the Saviour on Spilled Blood as their only hint for the location of their next Pit Stop. After this task, teams were no longer Intersected.

Additional note
Due to limited availability of flights, teams were provided tickets on a 2:45 p.m. flight to Saint Petersburg but were under no obligation to use them.

Leg 6 (Russia)

Airdate: 1 September 2014 (AU); 9 September 2014 (NZ)
 Saint Petersburg (Trans-Siberian Railway) (Moskovsky Railway Station) to Kostroma
Kostroma 
Kostroma
 Kostroma (Azimut Hotel Kostroma)
 Neysky District ( – North Hope Sled Dog Center)
Kostroma (Confluence of Volga and Kostroma Rivers overlooking Ipatiev Monastery) 

In this season's final Nation vs. Nation task, teams from each country had to team up, select three matryoshka dolls, and search among hundreds of other nesting dolls in five separate houses to find the four smaller pieces that belonged to each of the dolls they chose. Once the three teams had collected all twelve pieces, they all would receive their next clue.

This leg's Detour was a choice between Boil or Build. In Boil, teams had to fill a Russian outdoor bathing kettle with water until it reached the marked line and use wood and paper scraps to light a fire underneath it. Then, teams had to submerge themselves in the icy water to receive their next clue. In Build, teams had to stack a pile of firewood within a marked area so that it matched an example to receive their next clue from a woodsman.

In this leg's Roadblock, teams had to travel to the North Hope Sled Dog Center, where one team member had to ride a dog sled of Siberian Huskies and Alaskan Malamutes around a slalom course through the forest to receive their next clue.

Leg 7 (Russia → Portugal)

Airdate: 8 September 2014 (AU); 16 September 2014 (NZ)
Moscow (Orekhovo-Borisovo Metochion) (Pit Start)
 Moscow (Moscow Domodedovo Airport) to Lisbon, Portugal (Lisbon Airport)
Lisbon (Belém Tower)
 Lisbon (Fábrica Sant'Anna to )
 Lisbon (Rua de São Miguel and Beco do Pocinho or Calçadinha de São Miguel)
Lisbon (Largo do )
Cascais (Fisherman's Beach)
 Cascais (Restaurante A Económica)
Sintra (Pena Palace) 

This leg's Detour was a choice between Wet or Dry. In Wet, teams had to make their way to a section of the Lisbon streets celebrating the AgitÁgueda Art Festival, where thousands of umbrellas were hung above the streets, and count all of the yellow umbrellas (297). When teams wrote the correct answer on a chalkboard and presented it to a judge at a café on Rua da Regueira, they would receive their next clue. In Dry, teams had to find a group of women on the streets with laundry baskets that had their names attached. Teams then had to search among the washing lines above the nearby streets for the article of clothing with a name tag listing their laundry lady to receive their next clue.

Additional tasks
At Belém Tower, teams had to learn and correctly sing the Portuguese lyrics of the song "Fado do Cansaço" in sync with the music to receive their next clue from famous Fado singer Cuca Roseta.
At Largo do Chafariz de Dentro, teams had to choose a Renault Mégane parked across Museu do Fado and drive themselves to Fisherman's Beach in Cascais to find their next clue.

Additional note
Daniel & Ryan used their Salvage Pass to gain an hour time-credit at the start of the leg instead of using it to save the last place team from elimination during the previous leg.

Leg 8 (Portugal → Croatia)

Airdate: 15 September 2014 (AU); 23 September 2014 (NZ)
Lisbon (Altis Grand Hotel) (Pit Start)
 Lisbon (Lisbon Airport) to Dubrovnik, Croatia (Dubrovnik Airport)
Dubrovnik (Ploča Gate)
Dubrovnik (Minčeta Tower)
Dubrovnik (Old Harbour) (Overnight Rest)
Dubrovnik (Dominican Monastery)
 Dubrovnik (Three Churches and Muški Frizerski Salon)
Dubrovnik (Croata Necktie) 
Dubrovnik (Big Onofrio Fountain)
 Dubrovnik (Fort Bokar)
Dubrovnik (Fort Saint John) 
Dubrovnik (Fort St. Lawrence) 

In this season's only Fast Forward, teams had to travel to the Dominican Monastery, where they were instructed to collect a prayer card from three different churches, deliver them to Muški Frizerski Salon and would discover that they had to get a tonsure haircut for men or a nun haircut for women. The first team to do so would win the Fast Forward award. Daniel & Ryan won the Fast Forward.

For their Speed Bump, Ashleigh & Jarrod had to properly knot a necktie on each other, a bow tie and a four-in-hand, before they could continue racing.

In this leg's first Roadblock, one team member had to abseil face-first down the side of Fort Bokar to receive their next clue.

In this leg's second Roadblock, the team member who did not perform the previous Roadblock had to climb up Fort Saint John using an ascender to receive their next clue.

Additional tasks
At Ploča Gate, teams had to carry two stones up to the Watchman's Keep atop Minčeta Tower. Once there, the city guard would ask teams, "How many stairs did you count to reach me?" If teams wrote the right answer (139) on a chalkboard, the guard would give them their next clue.
At Old Harbour, teams had to sign up for one of three departure times, 15 minutes apart from each other starting at 8:30 a.m.
After the first Roadblock, teams had to walk along the city walls and search for their next clue near the south harbour wall of Fort Saint John.

Leg 9 (Croatia → Argentina)

Airdate: 15 September 2014 (AU); 30 September 2014 (NZ)
Dubrovnik (Dubrovnik West Harbour) (Pit Start)
 Dubrovnik (Dubrovnik Airport) to Buenos Aires, Argentina (Ministro Pistarini International Airport)
Luján (Estancia Las Bétulas) 
Buenos Aires (El Ateneo Grand Splendid)
 Buenos Aires (Pasaje de la Defensa or La Bombonera and La Recoleta Cemetery)
 Tigre (Argentina Rowing Club to Tigre Club) 

In this leg's Roadblock, one team member had to navigate a sulky, a horse-drawn carriage, to a polo field, where they had to properly dress and saddle a polo horse for competition to the satisfaction of a polo player to receive their next clue.

This season's final Detour, which paid tribute to Argentina's cultural heritage, was a choice between Tango or Tribute. In Tango, teams had to search through Carlos Gardel's biography, Tangos Que Cantó Gardel, for a card directing them to Pasaje de la Defensa, where both team members had to learn and perform a complex tango routine to the satisfaction of the judges to receive their next clue. In Tribute, teams had to search page 197 of  Diego Maradona's biography, Cebollita Maradona, to find his home stadium La Bombonera, where a football player instructed them in Spanish, "Find in the book, the hospital where Diego Maradona was born. Come back with the answer." Once teams found the answer in their book, Hospital Interzonal General de Agudos Evita, the football player then handed them a picture of Eva Perón directing them to the site of her grave, La Recoleta Cemetery, where they would find their next clue.

Additional tasks
The clue after the Roadblock instructed teams to find Buenos Aires's "most dramatic bookstore", which teams had to figure out was the El Ateneo Grand Splendid, a former theatre which was converted to a bookstore, to find their next clue.
At the Argentina Rowing Club in Tigre, teams had to row a rowboat upriver to the Pit Stop at the Tigre Club.

Leg 10 (Argentina → United States → Australia)

Airdate: 25 September 2014 (AU); 7 October 2014 (NZ)
Buenos Aires (Puerto Madero) (Pit Start)
 Buenos Aires (Ministro Pistarini International Airport) to Los Angeles, California, United States (Los Angeles International Airport)
Los Angeles (Hollywood Boulevard – Hollywood Walk of Fame and Ray's Photo Lab)
Los Angeles (Pink's Hot Dogs)
 Los Angeles (Los Angeles International Airport) to Melbourne, Victoria, Australia (Melbourne Airport)
 Melbourne (Moorabbin – Moorabbin Airport) to Port Campbell (Great Ocean Road) via Great Otway National Park (Otway Fly Treetop Walk)
Port Campbell (Port Campbell Jetty)
Port Campbell (Port Campbell Beach)
Port Campbell National Park (Loch Ard Gorge) 
Port Campbell National Park (Loch Ard Gorge – Mutton Bird Island Lookout) 

In this season's final Roadblock, one team member had to find the nine items worn or held by the Pit Stop greeters from a vast array of items and place the items in the correct order teams encountered them atop barrels to receive their final clue. The correct order of items was:

{| class="wikitable"
|-
!Leg #
!Country
!Item
|-
!1
|New Zealand
|Gumboots
|-
!2
|Cambodia
|Golden Leaves
|-
!3
|Thailand
|Coconut
|-
!4
|Namibia
|Bow
|-
!5
|Russia
|Ushanka
|-
!6
|Russia
|Auger
|-
!7
|Portugal
|Sword
|-
!8
|Croatia
|Red Kerchief
|-
!9
|Argentina
|Polo Mallet
|}

Additional tasks
Upon arrival in Los Angeles, teams had to find a Ford Mustang with their next clue, which instructed them to use a Polaroid camera to photograph themselves with three movie characters, who were portrayed by Australian-born actors, on the Hollywood Walk of Fame. If all three photographs were approved at Ray's Photo Lab, teams would receive their next clue.
At Pink's Hot Dogs, both team members had to eat a traditional Pink's hot dog to receive their next clue.
At the Great Otway National Park, teams had to search the Otway Fly Treetop Walk for their next clue located on a cantilever.
After finding the clue on Otway Fly Treetop Walk, teams were instructed to begin an "Air, Land & Sea" task. For the first task, teams would fly past the Twelve Apostles and had to search Port Campbell for a boat on land with the word "Loch" on it. When they found the word, they would land on Great Ocean Road and had to find a local fisherman at Port Campbell Jetty, who would give them their next clue for the second task in exchange for the correct word. Their second task was to find their second word "Ard" in a sandcastle on Port Campbell Beach. Lastly, they had to paddle out to a buoy in Port Campbell Bay and collect their third word, "Gorge". After returning ashore, teams had to present all three words to a lifeguard to receive their next clue, which instructed teams to combine the three words to form the location of their next clue: Loch Ard Gorge.

Additional note
On the flight from Los Angeles to Melbourne, all teams were given a free upgrade to Virgin Australia's business class. Along the way, teams were given a challenge to name the locations on the Virgin Australia route map. The best performing team on this task won a special prize.

Episode title quotes
Episode titles are often taken from quotes made by the racers.

"I Gotta Have Two Legs to Run the Race!" – Christie
"She's Got One Hell of a Body on Her and She Just Used It" – Jarrod
"Proper Preparation Prevents Piss-Poor Performance" – Christie
"We Have A Lot of Experience with Poo" – Carla
"Right Now I Don't Care If He Pees in His Pants" – Sally
"I'm Not Going to Come Last, I'm Just Going to Die on The Amazing Race" – Daniel
"There's A Lot of Bones In This, I Really Don't Wanna Die" – Cat
"I Can't Feel My Nadz!" – Jessie
"Dude, We Don't Want To Go To Your House" – Ryan
"At Least We Did Better Than the Bloody Kiwis" – Jarrod

Ratings

Australian Ratings
All ratings data in Australia are taken from the five major metropolitan centres. Data from regional areas is not accounted for. Due to poor programming from Channel 7 there is no set time-slot, but the start time for the show was around 8:40 p.m. to 9:10 p.m. Times are taken from Electronic Programming Guides which still may not be accurate as to the real start time. Despite the lower ratings compared to the previous series, the show rated well in time shift, often being among the highest viewership gainers for the night.

New Zealand Ratings

References

External links
 
 

Australia 3
2014 Australian television seasons
TVNZ 2 original programming
Television shows filmed in Australia
Television shows filmed in New Zealand
Television shows filmed in Cambodia
Television shows filmed in Thailand
Television shows filmed in Namibia
Television shows filmed in Russia
Television shows filmed in Portugal
Television shows filmed in Croatia
Television shows filmed in Argentina
Television shows filmed in Los Angeles